Veslemøy Haslund (8 April 1939 – 7 November 2005) was a Norwegian actress and stage producer. She was born in Oslo. She made her stage debut at Trøndelag Teater in 1959. She was later assigned to various theatres, including Det Norske Teatret, Fjernsynsteatret, Nationaltheatret and Teater Ibsen. She trained at RADA and made her film debut in 1967, in Det største spillet, and  further contributed to various films, including Bare et liv from 1968 depicting important episodes in the life of Fridtjof Nansen, Marikens bryllup from 1972, Vårnatt from 1976, Formyndere from 1979, and Kristin Lavransdatter from 1995.

References

1939 births
2005 deaths
Actresses from Oslo
Norwegian stage actresses
Norwegian film actresses